is a Japanese private spaceflight company aiming to eventually build a launch vehicle for smallsats under 100 kg. It is a rocket spacelaunch company developing the MOMO (also Momo, etc.) launcher. Interstellar's stated goal is to reduce the cost of access to space.

In 2017, it became the first Japanese company to launch a privately-developed space rocket, though the launch was unsuccessful. A subsequent test in 2019 was successful at taking a 20 kg payload on a suborbital trajectory to the edge of space. , the company planned to develop a rocket by 2020 that would be capable of launching small satellites into orbit. As of 2018, the president is Takahiro Inagawa.

As of June 2018, the company had raised about ¥30 million (about ) in crowdfunding.

History 
The group that became Interstellar Technologies was created as a hobbyist organization in 1997. Interstellar Technologies predecessor company was established in 2003 by Takafumi Horie, who previously founded the ISP Livedoor. It was established to develop rockets to launch small satellites. It became Interstellar Technologies in 2005 (some sources name the year 2013 as the founding year of Interstellar Technologies). Interstellar plans to lower the cost of access to space, and is attempting to have the first privately developed rocket in Japan to reach space.

In March 2018, Interstellar entered into a business alliance with Nippon Travel Agency and Space Development Corp. In May 2018, Interstellar received an investment of ¥19.8 million from Kushiro Manufacturing.

Rockets

MOMO sounding rocket 
The initial rocket the company is developing is the MOMO sounding rocket:
 First launch: 30 July 2017 (failure)
 First successful launch: 3 May 2019 (UTC)
 Launch attempts: 7 (3 successful)
 Height:  
 Diameter:  
 Mass: 
 Apogee: , capable of reaching the Karman line or the boundary of space.
 Payload to Karman line:  
 Engine: Custom Helium Pressure-fed engine with 12 kilonewtons of thrust 
 Fuel: Ethanol with Liquid Oxygen (LOX)
 Cost: ¥50 million (~$440 thousand)

MOMO v1 
In response to the problems encountered in the engine nozzle and ignitor during the fifth launch and in the first attempt of the sixth launch (June and July 2020 respectively) Interstellar Technology began development of a full system upgrade. During a video conference on June 1, 2021 they announced the end of the upgrading process that focused on engine system, airframe equipment, avionics, and ground support equipment  resulting in new nozzles, new ignitors, an increase in dry mass by 40 kg, in propellant mass by 30 kg, in length by 0.2 m and in thrust by 2 kN. Due to the heavy modifications performed the company started referring to the previous version of the rocket as MOMO v0, while the upgraded one is now being called MOMO v1.

MOMO flight testing 

The flight test program began in mid-2017:

ZERO orbital rocket 

The ZERO rocket concept is aimed at orbital launches of smallsats.
 First launch: 2023 (estimated)
 Payload to  Sun-Synchronous Orbit: 
Fuel: Liquid methane (Liquefied natural gas, LNG)

Facilities 
 Launch site: Taiki Aerospace Research Field, Taiki, Hokkaido, Japan.

See also 

 Blue Origin
 PD AeroSpace, Japanese spaceplane developer
 Rocket Lab
 SpaceX

References

External links 
  Official website: インターステラテクノロジズ株式会社 - Interstellar Technologies Inc.
  インターステラテクノロジズ株式会社 - Interstellar Technologies Inc.
  Interstellar Technologies 

Space program of Japan
Commercial spaceflight
Private spaceflight companies
Technology companies established in 2005
Aerospace companies of Japan